The Gould GR51 is an open-wheel race car, designed, developed and built by British company Gould Racing, specifically for the British Sprint Championship, since 2000.

References 

Open wheel racing cars